Fabian Windhager (born 7 September 2001) is an Austrian footballer who plays as a defender for Second League club  Blau-Weiß Linz.

References

2001 births
Living people
Austrian footballers
Austria youth international footballers
Association football defenders
FC Liefering players
FC Blau-Weiß Linz players
2. Liga (Austria) players